The Lustgarten (Pleasure Garden) is a park on Museum Island in central Berlin, near the site of the former  (Berlin City Palace) of which it was originally a part. At various times in its history, the park has been used as a parade ground, a place for mass rallies and a public park.

The area of the Lustgarten was originally developed in the 16th century as a kitchen garden attached to the Palace, then the residence of the Elector of Brandenburg, the core of the later Kingdom of Prussia. After the devastation of Germany during the Thirty Years War, Berlin was redeveloped by Friedrich Wilhelm (the Great Elector) and his Dutch wife, Luise Henriette of Nassau. It was Luise, with the assistance of a military engineer Johann Mauritz and a landscape gardener Michael Hanff, who, in 1646, converted the former kitchen garden into a formal garden, with fountains and geometric paths, and gave it its current name.

In 1713, Friedrich Wilhelm I became King of Prussia and set about converting Prussia into a militarised state. He ripped out his grandmother's garden and converted the  into a sand-covered parade ground: Pariser Platz near the Brandenburg Gate and Leipziger Platz were also laid out as parade grounds at this time.

In the early 19th century, the enlarged and increasingly wealthy Kingdom of Prussia undertook major redevelopments of central Berlin. A 13-metre high fountain in the centre, operated by a steam engine, was one of the marvels of the age. In 1871, the fountain was replaced by a large equestrian statue of Friedrich Wilhelm III by Albert Wolff. The statue was unveiled on 16 June 1871. Between 1894 and 1905, the old Protestant church on the northern side of the park was replaced by a much larger building, the Berlin Cathedral (in German, "Berliner Dom"), designed by Julius Carl Raschdorff.

The Socialists and Communists held frequent rallies there. In August 1921, 500,000 people demonstrated against right-wing extremist violence. On 7 February 1933, 200,000 people demonstrated against the new Nazi Party regime of Adolf Hitler: shortly afterwards public opposition to the regime was banned. In 1934, it was paved over and the equestrian statue removed. Hitler addressed mass rallies of up to a million people there.

On 18 May 1942 a resistance group led by Herbert Baum consisting mainly of Jewish men and women, tried to destroy a propaganda exhibition The Soviet Paradise in the Lustgarten. This resulted in the discovery of the group, the death of Baum in Gestapo detention and the execution of at least 27 members of the group. In a "retaliation action," the Reich Security Main Office arrested 500 Jewish men at the end of May, and immediately murdered half of them. A memorial stone made by Jürgen Raue installed in 1981 commemorates the resistance group.

In 1944 the statue of Friedrich Wilhelm III by Albert Wolff was melted down to reuse the metal in war production.

The German Democratic Republic left Hitler's paving in place, but planted lime trees around the parade ground to reduce its militaristic appearance. The whole area was renamed Marx-Engels-Platz. The City Palace was demolished and later replaced by the modernist Palace of the Republic on part of the site.

In 1997, the Berlin Senate commissioned the landscape architect Hans Loidl to redesign the area in the spirit of Lenné's design and construction work began in 1998. The  now features fountains and is once again a park in the heart of a reunited Berlin.

References

External links

Heritage sites in Berlin
Museum Island
Parks in Berlin
Rebuilt buildings and structures in Berlin
Urban public parks